Topo or TOPO may refer to:

 Topo (Calheta), a civil parish in the municipality of Calheta, in the Portuguese archipelago of the Azores
 Topo (climbing), in climbing, a guide for a crag or climbing area
 Topo (robot), a robot aimed at the consumer and educational market, produced during the 1980s by Androbot
 Topography or topographic map
 Trioctylphosphine oxide, abbreviated as TOPO
 TOPO cloning, in genetics
 Los Topos, a 1970s California theatre group, one of whose members was also known as Topo
 Topo (DC Comics), a fictional character in the Aquaman series
 Topo Gigio, a popular Italian puppet character, made famous by appearances on The Ed Sullivan Show
 Topos de Tlatelolco, an earthquake and natural disaster search and rescue squad from Mexico
 Topo, a genus of comb-footed spiders

El Topo may refer to:
 El Topo, 1970 Mexican film
 El Topo (Puerto Rican singer/songwriter), stage name for Antonio Caban Vale

See also 
 Topophilia
 Topol (disambiguation)
 Topos (disambiguation)